Miguel Cabrita (born 30 September 1974) is a Portuguese former butterfly swimmer. He competed at the 1992 Summer Olympics and the 1996 Summer Olympics.

References

External links
 

1974 births
Living people
Portuguese male butterfly swimmers
Olympic swimmers of Portugal
Swimmers at the 1992 Summer Olympics
Swimmers at the 1996 Summer Olympics
People from Tavira
Portuguese male freestyle swimmers
Sportspeople from Faro District
20th-century Portuguese people
21st-century Portuguese people